"Animal" is the debut single by American rock band Neon Trees, released on March 16, 2010 from their debut studio album, Habits.

Chart performance
The song reached number 13 on the US Billboard Hot 100 and number 29 in Canada. It also reached number one on the Billboard Alternative Songs chart after 32 weeks, making "Animal" their first number-one song on a Billboard chart. This also broke the record for the longest-length of time for a song to get to the top of that list after entering. The song reached number two on the Billboard Rock Songs chart. On May 22, 2011, the song won Top Alternative Song at the 2011 Billboard Music Awards. It was certified double platinum by the Recording Industry Association of America in December 2011. "Animal" was the first song to be number one on the Alternative Songs chart and to be in the top 20 of the Billboard Hot 100 since Linkin Park's "New Divide" in June 2009.

In popular culture
The song received increased coverage after it was played on Jimmy Kimmel Live!, The Tonight Show with Jay Leno, Adam Hills in Gordon Street Tonight, Lopez Tonight, Conan, and Live with Regis & Kelly by the band. It was also featured on the TV shows Melrose Place and Secrets of Aspen. The TV show Glee'''s Dalton Academy Warblers performed a duet version in the episode "Sexy". It was sung by characters Blaine Anderson, played by Darren Criss, and Kurt Hummel, played by Chris Colfer. It peaked at number 62 on the Billboard Hot 100.

The song has also been covered live by the Wanted, Train, Bridgit Mendler, Taylor Swift, Panic! at the Disco and Secondhand Serenade. The song was released as downloadable content for Rock Band'' in August 2010.

Charts

Weekly charts

Year-end charts

Decade-end charts

Certifications

Release history

References

2010 songs
2010 debut singles
Mercury Records singles
Neon Trees songs
Songs written by Tim Pagnotta
Songs written by Tyler Glenn